Moor Park is a London Underground station in the Three Rivers district of Hertfordshire, serving those living on the Moor Park estate, and also on the neighbouring Eastbury and South Oxhey estates. The station is outside the Greater London boundary but is in both Zone 6 and Zone 7, between the Metropolitan line stations of Rickmansworth, Croxley (on the Watford branch) and Northwood.

History
The route extension from Pinner to Rickmansworth opened in 1887 by the Metropolitan Railway. Shortly after in 1899, Great Central Railway trains also passed here, following the Metropolitan via Verney Junction. Moor Park didn't open until 9 May 1910, and the station was called Sandy Lodge, after the Sandy Lodge Golf Course. It was renamed to Moor Park & Sandy Lodge in 1923 to reflect the area it was in. The lines were electrified in 1925 when the Watford branch was opened and electric-hauled trains passed to Rickmansworth to exchange the traction for steam. In 1950 the station was renamed to Moor Park and it was completely rebuilt in 1961, increasing the number of platforms to four: two for northbound trains (one for slow/semi-fast and one for fast services) and two for southbound trains to the city. British Rail and Network SouthEast trains stopped calling at Moor Park from 1993.

Since the 2011 timetable, fast and semi-fast trains have only run during peak times. The fast trains to Aldgate call from platform 2 during the morning peak, and to Amersham or Chesham from platform 1 during the evening peak.  At all other times, and all day at weekends, trains depart from platforms 3 and 4, providing all station or semi-fast services to Baker Street or Aldgate going southbound, and to Watford, Amersham or Chesham northbound.

References

Gallery

External links

 www.railwayarchive.org.uk
 Moor Park station platforms, 1944
 Moor Park station entrance, 2001
  Moor Park station platforms, 1962.

Metropolitan line stations
Tube stations in Hertfordshire
Former Metropolitan and Great Central Joint Railway stations
Railway stations in Great Britain opened in 1910